Guannan may refer to:

Guannan County, in Jiangsu, China
Kwannam, traditional Korean term used to refer to the southern region of Hamgyong province